André Heuzé, or sometimes André Heuse, (5 December 1880, in Saint-Arnoult-en-Yvelines –16 August 1942 in Paris) was a French movie director, screenwriter and playwright.

Filmography

Director 
 1906 : La Course à la perruque
 1908 : Mon pantalon est décousu
 1912 : Le Sursis
 1912 : Ma concierge est trop jolie
 1913 : De film... en aiguilles
 1914 : Le Bossu
 1916 : Debout les morts !

Screenwriter 

 1905 : Dix femmes pour un mari by Georges Hatot, Lucien Nonguet and Ferdinand Zecca
 1905 : Le Voleur de bicyclette
 1906 : Boireau déménage
 1906 : Chiens contrebandiers
 1906 : Drame passionnel by Albert Capellani
 1906 : La Course à la perruque
 1906 : La Femme du lutteur by Albert Capellani
 1906 : La Fille du sonneur by Albert Capellani
 1906 : La Grève des bonnes
 1906 : La Voix de la conscience by Albert Capellani
 1906 : La Loi du pardon by Albert Capellani
 1906 : L'Âge du cœur by Albert Capellani
 1906 : Le Billet de faveur
 1906 : Les Débuts d'un chauffeur
 1906 : Les Dessous de Paris
 1906 : Les Étudiants de Paris
 1906 : Les Malheurs de Madame Durand
 1906 : Les Meurt-de-faim
 1906 : Mortelle Idylle by Albert Capellani
 1907 : À Biribi, disciplinaires français
 1907 : La Course des belles-mères
 1907 : La Course des sergents de ville
 1907 : La Grève des nourrices
 1907 : La Lutte pour la vie
 1907 : La Mort d'un toréador
 1907 : La Vengeance du forgeron
 1907 : Les Femmes cochers
 1908 : Le Cheval emballé
 1908 : Mon pantalon est décousu
 1913 : De film... en aiguilles
 1918 : Un duel à la dynamite
 1931 : En bordée
 1935 : Le Champion de ces dames
 1936 : Le Roman d'un spahi
 1937 : La Fille de la Madelon
 1937 : Les Chevaliers de la cloche
 1938 : Ceux de demain
 1946 : The Diary of a Chambermaid, coauthor of the stage adaptation

Actor 
1923 : La Rue du pavé d'amour by André Hugon
1928 : Little Devil May Care as André Bucaille
1928 : La grande épreuve as Roger Duchêne

Playwright 
1905: Ali-Gaga, ou du Quarante à l'heure, vaudeville in 1 act
1909: Tous papas, comédie-vaudeville in 1 act, with Louis Feuillade
1913: La Petite Manon, opéra-comique in 4 acts, with Maurice Ordonneau
1919 La Ceinture électrique, vaudeville in 1 act, with Etienne Arnaud 
1923: Lulu, garde ton cœur !, vaudeville in 3 acts, with Etienne Arnaud
1929: En bordée, vaudeville in 3 acts, with Pierre Veber
1930: L'Avant de ces dames, vaudeville in trois acts, with Pierre Veber
1931: Le Roman d'une femme de chambre, 3-act play cowritten with André de Lorde after the novel by Octave Mirbeau
1932: Bonsoir Paris, operetta
 La Madone des sleepings, with André de Lorde, after Maurice Dekobra
 Ma tante la moukère, with Étienne Arnaud

External links 
 
 18 films liés à André Heuzé sur CinéRessources.net

Silent film directors
20th-century French screenwriters
French male film actors
French male silent film actors
20th-century French male actors
20th-century French dramatists and playwrights
Film directors from Paris
Male actors from Paris
1880 births
1942 deaths